Sir Israel Gollancz, FBA (13 July 1863 – 23 June 1930) was a scholar of early English literature and of Shakespeare. He was Professor of English Language and Literature at King's College, London, from 1903 to 1930.

Gollancz was born 13 July 1863, in London, sixth of seven children of Rabbi Samuel Marcus Gollancz (1820–1900), cantor of the Hambro Synagogue, London, and his wife, Johanna Koppell.  He was the younger brother of Sir Hermann Gollancz and the uncle of the publisher Victor Gollancz.  In 1910, he married Alide Goldschmidt in London.

He was a founder member and the first Secretary (1902–1930) of the British Academy and of the committee for a Shakespeare Memorial Theatre, which eventually became the Royal National Theatre in London, and he was the Director of the Early English Text Society. He edited the "Temple" Shakespeare, a uniform edition of the complete works in pocket size volumes which was the most popular Shakespeare edition of its day. In 1916, as Honorary Secretary of the Shakespeare Tercentenary Committee, he also edited A Book of Homage to Shakespeare, an anthology of responses to Shakespeare from scholars, thinkers and other prominent figures from around the world. He also produced a translation in modern English of the important medieval Christian allegorical poem Pearl, which he theorized may have been the work of Ralph Strode. He contributed articles to the Dictionary of National Biography. Gollancz was knighted in 1919. In 1922 he delivered the British Academy's Shakespeare Lecture.

Death and legacy
Gollancz died on 23 June 1930 in London, and was buried on 26 June at the Jewish Cemetery at Willesden. In the year of his death, the British Academy held a memorial lecture in his name, at which they unveiled a bust of Sir Israel. 

He had been working on Sir Gawain and the Green Knight and this was unfinished when he died. His long time collaborator, Mabel Day, completed the work and it was published in 1940. Mum and the Sothsegger was also completed by Day and Robert Steele and published in 1936.

The British Academy awards the Sir Israel Gollancz prize for Early English Studies.

Obituary

References 

1864 births
1930 deaths
19th-century British people
20th-century British people
Shakespearean scholars
People educated at the City of London School
English Jews
English people of German-Jewish descent
Fellows of the British Academy
Academics of King's College London
Knights Bachelor
Israel Gollancz
Corresponding Fellows of the Medieval Academy of America
Burials at Willesden Jewish Cemetery